Ahmed Zergui (El Abbassi) (Arabic أحمد زرقي) (born 1948 in Sidi Bel Abbès, Algeria – 27 November 1983 in Tenira, Algeria) was an Algerian raï singer-songwriter.

He was a pioneer in introducing the Wah-wah pedal into raï music. In the 70s he founded the group Les Frères Zergui consisting of Kacem Atek (rhythm guitar), Benyamna (organ), El Ârbi (drums), Bengamra (accordion). It is believed that "Les Frères Zergui" (the Zergui Brothers) was not composed of brothers but rather of a group of friends. In fact the nickname of the Zergui brothers (زرقي , indigo, blue) was chosen at the time by the editors and this among other things because of their tanned complexion.

Zergui died on 27 November 1983, in a road accident, while driving his car.

Discography

Ana Maneouiliche / Baghi Nassbek (7", Single) (Sassiphone, date unknown)
Succès 82 - Maderti Chohra (Edition Mekkeraphone, 1982)
Les Frères Zargui (Edition Royale / La Nouvelle Étoile, 1983)
1970's Algerian Proto-Rai Underground (Sublime Frequencies, 2008)

Songs

Aala Moulat El Khana
Alache Jiti Tranji
Ana Hak
Andi Mhayna
Atatni Hdiya (covered by )
Chaba (covered by Khaled)
Delali ha delali (covered by khaled) 
Khalti Fatima
Maderti Chohra
Mnine Jate
Nacera (covered by Cheb Yazid)

References

External links

1948 births
1983 deaths
Raï musicians
Algerian songwriters
People from Sidi Bel Abbès
20th-century Algerian male singers
Road incident deaths in Algeria